The 2022 Gran Piemonte was the 106th edition of the Gran Piemonte (known as Giro del Piemonte until 2009) single-day cycling race. It was held on 6 October 2022, over a distance of 198 km, starting in Omegna and ending in Beinasco.

Teams 
16 of the 18 UCI WorldTeams and seven UCI ProTeams made up the 23 teams that participated in the race. In total, 156 riders started the race, of which 144 finished.

UCI WorldTeams

 
 
 
 
 
 
 
 
 
 
 
 
 
 
 
 

UCI ProTeams

Results

References

Gran Piemonte
Giro del Piemonte
Gran Piemonte
Gran Piemonte